Close to You: Remembering The Carpenters is a 100-minute-long documentary that was released on DVD by MPI Home Video. It features interviews by Richard Carpenter, John Bettis (co-writer), Gary Sims (part-time member), Petula Clark, et al.

The documentary itself runs for approximately 60 minutes, with a 12-minute encore after the end credits featuring a performance of "(A Place To) Hideaway", the Carpenters' commercial for Morton's Potato Chips, and their performance of "Ave Maria" for the 1978 A Christmas Portrait special. The rest of the 100 minute total running time includes the special features (listed below).

The documentary originally aired as a special on PBS and continues to be made available to PBS stations for rerunning during pledge drives.

Chapters
Introduction ("Superstar", "Rainy Days and Mondays", "We've Only Just Begun", "(They Long to Be) Close to You")
"Yesterday Once More" – Thank You Rock 'n' Roll, 1978
"Dancing in the Street" – Your All American College Show, 1968
"Ticket to Ride" – Something Else, 1970
"(They Long to Be) Close to You" – Make Your Own Kind of Music, 1971
"We've Only Just Begun" – Make Your Own Kind of Music, 1971
"For All We Know" – The Andy Williams Show, 1971
"Bless the Beasts and Children" – Make Your Own Kind of Music, 1971
"Rainy Days and Mondays" – Desert Inn, then fades into Make Your Own Kind of Music, 1971
"Superstar" – 1971
"Hurting Each Other" – 1972
"Goodbye to Love" – 1972
"Top of the World" – Carpenters' Very First Television Special, 1976
And the Story Continues...
"Only Yesterday" – 1975
"Merry Christmas Darling" – A Christmas Portrait, 1978
"This Masquerade" – Music, Music, Music!, 1980
"Touch Me When We're Dancing" – 1981
Finale
"(They Long to Be) Close to You" – Carpenters' Very First Television Special, 1976
End Credits
Encore Program
"(A Place To) Hideaway" – Make Your Own Kind of Music, 1971
Potato Chip Commercial – Morton's Potato Chip Company, 1971
"Ave Maria" – A Christmas Portrait, 1978
TV Special Promo – 1980

Bonus material:
Photo gallery (1991 remix, Richard Carpenter's Pianist • Arranger • Composer • Conductor version, and reprise of "Yesterday Once More")
At the White House (Rare footage of Nixon and the Carpenters; "Top of the World") – 1972
Radio Jingle – KFRC Radio
Chocolate Commercial – Morinaga Hi-Crown Milk Chocolates, 1974
Soda Pop Commercials – Suntory Pop, 1977

Certifications and sales

References

The Carpenters video albums
Documentary films about singers
1997 video albums
Documentary films about women in music